West Jaintia Hills (Pron: ˈʤeɪnˌtɪə) is an administrative District in the state of Meghalaya in India. The united district (Jaintia Hills District) was created on 22 February 1972 and occupied an area of 3819 km2. It had a population of 272,185 (as of 2011). The district is part of the Meghalaya subtropical forests eco-region. With the bifurcation of the erstwhile Jaintia Hills District into East and West Jaintia Hills Districts, West Jaintia Hills District came into existence on 31 July 2012 with its headquarters at Jowai. Jowai is the host of all the heads of important governmental offices and establishments, educational institutions, hospitals, banking institutions, etc.

Geography
The total area of the district is 1693 km2. The district comprises one Civil Sub-Division Viz. Amlarem Civil Sub-Division and three Community and Rural Development Blocks viz. Amlarem C&RD Block, Laskein C&RD Block and Thadlaskein C&RD Block with the following  boundaries:

 North – Assam
 South – Bangladesh and East Jaintia Hills district
 East – Assam
 West – East Khasi Hills District

Economy

Although the mainstay of the district is agriculture, however, due to the abundance of Limestone, plenty of Cement factories have been set up in the district (now East Jaintia Hills). More are set to come up. Coal mining at sites like Lad Rymbai (East Jaintia Hills district) is also one of the major activities. Coal mined here is mostly exported to Bangladesh and Assam. Most of the coal mining sites are now situated in the East Jaintia Hills district.

Agriculture

Lakadong Turmeric is a type of turmeric variety found on the West Jaintia hills district. It is one of the world’s finest turmeric varieties with the highest curcumin content of 7-9 % in comparison to 3% or less in other turmeric varieties. It has been identified under the One District, One Product (ODOP) initiative of Indian government. The State of Meghalaya has also applied for a Geographical Indication tag for it.

Divisions

Administrative divisions
United Jaintia Hills district was divided into five blocks. With the bifurcation of the erstwhile district, West Jaintia Hills is divided into three blocks:

Transport
Since it is land locked region and lack of railways and airport, the only means of transportation is roadways. The main highway which runs through the district is NH 40 and NH 44.

Demographics
The district has a total population of 272,185, of which 134,406 are males and  135,946 are females. The density of population is 159.69 per km2. Scheduled Tribes are 257,941 which is 94.76% of the population.

Languages

At the time of the 2011 census, 78.17% of the population spoke Pnar, 12.55% War and 6.64% Khasi as their first language.

The common dialect in West Jaintia hills is Pnar, closely related to Khasi. Other dialects include Khynriam in the western part of district and War in the southern part of the district.

Culture

Places of interest
The places of interest in Jaintia hills include the below:
Monolith in Nartiang - Touted as the tallest monolith in the world.
Jowai: Jowai, the headquarters of the West Jaintia Hills district is situated 64 km from the national highway.  A town circled by the Myntdu River.
Thadlaskein Lake: 56 km from Shillong. According to legend this lake was dug with the ends of bows by members of 290 clans of U Sajar Niangli, a rebel general of Jaintia king, to commemorate the great exodus of the clans.
Megalithic Remnants- Nartiang: 65 km from Shillong, was the summer capital of the Jaintia Kings, of Sutnga State. Huge monoliths, form a landmark in the village. The Nartiang menhir measures 27 feet 6 inches in thickness.
Syndai: An important village of West Jaintia Hills which is famous for a number of caves and caverns in the limestone-borne area, used as hide-outs during war times between Jaintia Hills and foreign intruders.
Syntu Ksiar: Syntu Ksiar, which means 'golden flower' is a vast pool of calm water, where the river Myntdu which almost encircles Jowai, appears to come to a sudden halt.
Krangshuri Falls: A tourist spot in Amlarem Sub-Division (War-Jaintia)

Education
Although West Jaintia Hills is not known as an education hub. Good schools and colleges do exist in Jowai, Khliehriat and Nongtalang. Prominent Colleges in West Jaintia hills include Jowai Polytechnic which is an AICTE recognised college and the only Nursing School in the district is Dr. Norman Tunnel Hospital School Of Nursing, there are other colleges too namely Thomas Jones Synod College, Nongtalang College and Kiang Nangbah Govt. College Jowai which offers degree courses in arts and science.
Jowai has good schools too for Secondary and Higher Secondary level , some of the well known schools in Jowai are K.J.P Synod Mihngi Higher Secondary School, St Mary Mazzarello Girls Higher Secondary School , North Liberty Higher Secondary School etc .

See also
 Hills States

References

External links 
 Official website

 
Districts of Meghalaya
Autonomous regions of India
2012 establishments in Meghalaya